Adam Pettle (born 1973) is a Canadian playwright, radio producer, and television writer, most noted as the showrunner and executive producer on the CTV and Ion Television hospital drama Saving Hope.

Biography

Theatre
Born in Toronto in 1973, Pettle is a graduate of the National Theatre School of Canada's (NTS) playwriting program. He received a BA in theatre from Dalhousie University in 1994.

His first play, Therac 25 (1995), is autobiographical – Pettle received extensive treatment for thyroid cancer in the early 1990s. It stages a developing romance in the halls of a cancer treatment unit. His next drama, Zadie's Shoes (2000), is one of the few Canadian plays to successfully transfer from a medium-size house (The Factory Theatre) to the commercial Winter Garden Theatre. It has been produced across Canada as well as in the US and the UK.

Zadie's Shoes, Sunday Father and Therac 25 have all been nominated for Dora Awards for best new play.

Television and radio
In 2006, Pettle began his move towards television writing, penning an original pilot Clean for Ilana Frank and Thump Inc (now ICF Films). He has since worked on several Canadian and American television series, including Combat Hospital, King, Rookie Blue, X Company, and Saving Hope. He was nominated a Gemini Award in 2010 for a Rookie Blue episode entitled "Big Nickel," co-written with Morwyn Brebner. He is credited as a co-producer on King and executive producer on Saving Hope.

Pettle is also co-creator and head writer of the miniseries Afghanada, heard on CBC Radio.

Personal life
He is married to Patricia Fagan. They have two children, Alice and Lev Pettle. As a teen, Pettle was a well-known break dancer with the street name "Kid Quik".

Work

Plays

Television

Production staff

Writer

References

1973 births
Living people
Canadian male dramatists and playwrights
Canadian television writers
Canadian television producers
Writers from Toronto
Dalhousie University alumni
National Theatre School of Canada alumni
Showrunners
20th-century Canadian dramatists and playwrights
21st-century Canadian dramatists and playwrights
Canadian radio writers
20th-century Canadian male writers
21st-century Canadian male writers
Canadian male television writers